The nasal palatal approximant is a type of consonantal sound used in some oral languages.

The nasal palatal approximant is sometimes called a nasal yod;  and  may be called nasal glides.

Features
Features of the nasal palatal approximant:

 It is a nasal consonant, which means air is allowed to escape through the nose, in this case in addition to through the mouth.

Occurrence
, written ny, is a common realization of  before nasal vowels in many languages of West Africa that do not have a phonemic distinction between voiced nasal and oral stops, such as Yoruba, Ewe and Bini languages.

See also
 Palatal nasal
 Nasal labio-velar approximant
 Labiodental nasal, which may be an approximant in the one language in which it is phonemic
 Voiceless nasal glottal approximant
 Index of phonetics articles

Notes

References

Further reading

External links
 

Nasal consonants
Palatal consonants
Central consonants
Voiced consonants
Pulmonic consonants